Ross Glover (born 5 May 1964) is a New Zealand cricketer. He played in eleven first-class and twenty List A matches for Central Districts from 1985 to 1992.

See also
 List of Central Districts representative cricketers

References

External links
 

1964 births
Living people
New Zealand cricketers
Central Districts cricketers
Cricketers from Masterton